The Big Heist is a 2001 crime drama television film directed by Robert Markowitz and written by Jere Cunningham and Gary Hoffman. The film, based on the 1986 non-fiction book The Heist by Ernest Volkman and John Cummings, tells the story of the 1978 Lufthansa heist. It is a co-production of the United States and Canada, and stars Donald Sutherland, John Heard, Jamie Harris, and Janet Kidder. It aired on A&E on June 10, 2001.

Plot
Based on the 1986 book The Heist: How a Gang Stole $8,000,000 at Kennedy Airport and Lived to Regret It, the film tells the story about the 1978 Lufthansa heist.

Cast

 Donald Sutherland as Jimmy Burke
 John Heard as Richard Woods
 Jamie Harris as Frankie Burke
 Janet Kidder as Maria
 Nick Sandow as Henry Hill
 Michael P. Moran as Louis the Whale, inspired by Louis Cafora
 Joe Pingue as Martin Krugman
Bo Rucker as Parnell "Stacks" Edwards
 Rocco Sisto as Tommy DeSimone
Robert Morelli as Angelo Sepe
Joe Maruzzo as Paolo Falcone, inspired by Paolo LiCastri
Gino Marrocco as Paulie Vario
 Sam Coppola as Paul Castellano
Steven Randazzo as John Gotti
Craig Eldridge as Agent Billings

Production

Similar projects
The heist was also the subject of the much better-known 1990 film Goodfellas, directed by Martin Scorsese, and of the 1991 made-for-television film, The 10 Million Dollar Getaway. Filming took place in Toronto.

Historical context

Although the movie correctly depicts the Lufthansa heist, showing Jimmy Burke as the leader of a crew linked to Paulie Vario, the crew wasn't part of the Gambino family as depicted, but rather was a large part of the Lucchese crime family, and the robbery brought a large quantity of funding for Tony Corallo.

The film depicts Burke as an Irish immigrant, speaking with a strong Irish accent; he was in fact born and raised in the United States.

Although Burke did have connections with John Gotti, Gotti was never involved with the Lufthansa heist nor did he want to be a part of it. According to a rumour, on an FBI wire tap from the 1980s years after the original heist, Gotti was heard to say to underboss and his capo Aniello Dellacroce: "I didn't want any part of that shit that Burke and those other fucks pulled. Only micks would do something crazy like this. Micks are fucking crazy; end of fucking statement". It was also alleged by Hill, in Hill's book The Lufthansa Heist, that John Gotti personally killed Tommy DeSimone, a member of the stick-up team.

References

External links
 
 

2001 films
2001 crime drama films
2000s English-language films
2000s heist films
A&E (TV network) original films
Alliance Atlantis films
American docudrama films
American drama television films
American films based on actual events
American heist films
Canadian docudrama films
Canadian drama television films
Canadian films based on actual events
Canadian heist films
Crime films based on actual events
Crime television films
Cultural depictions of Paul Castellano
Cultural depictions of John Gotti
Drama films based on actual events
English-language Canadian films
Films about the American Mafia
Films based on non-fiction books
Films directed by Robert Markowitz
Films set in 1978
Films set in New York City
Films shot in Toronto
Lufthansa heist
Television films based on actual events
Television films based on books
2000s American films
Canadian gangster films